Orda Cave (Ординская, Ordinskaya) is a gypsum crystal cave found underneath the western Ural Mountains. The mouth is near the shore of the Kungur River just outside Orda, Perm Krai in Russia. This makes it one of the longest underwater caves and the largest underwater gypsum cave in the world. It contains the longest siphon in the former Soviet Union (935 meters).

The mineral-rich area surrounding the cave filters the water and makes it very clear. Divers have a visibility of over  making it an ideal location for photographic expeditions. Victor Lyagushkin, a journalist and underwater photographer, led around 150 expeditions into the caves over a six-month period in 2011. The photographs taken by his team were published in the Orda Cave Awareness Project alongside stories from other divers who had visited the cave system. The diving team were also the first people to produce a spherical panorama of an underwater cave.

A local myth tells of the "Lady of the Orda Cave" who is said to live in the caves.

The cave has also been visited during dives by Martyn Farr, Lamar Hires, Pascal Bernabé, and Reggie Ross.

References

Caves of Russia
Landforms of Perm Krai
Gypsum caves